|}

The Drinmore Novice Chase is a Grade 1 National Hunt chase in Ireland which is open to horses aged four years or older. It is run at Fairyhouse over a distance of about 2 miles and 4 furlongs (4,023 metres), and during its running there are sixteen fences to be jumped. The race is for novice chasers, and it is scheduled to take place each year in late November or early December.

The event was first run in its present form in 1994, when it replaced a previous version called the Drinmore Chase. Since then it has held Grade 1 status, and it is now usually staged on the same afternoon as two other top-grade races – the Royal Bond Novice Hurdle and the Hatton's Grace Hurdle.

Records
Leading jockey since 1994 (4 wins):
 Davy Russell – Cailin Alainn (2006), Don Cossack (2013), Death Duty (2017), Delta Work (2018)

Leading trainer since 1994 (7 wins):

 Gordon Elliott – Jessies Dream (2010), Don Cossack (2013), No More Heroes (2015), Death Duty (2017), Delta Work (2018), Envoi Allen (2020), Mighty Potter (2022)

Winners since 1994

See also
 Horse racing in Ireland
 List of Irish National Hunt races

References
 Racing Post:
 pedigreequery.com – Drinmore Novice Chase – Fairyhouse.

National Hunt races in Ireland
National Hunt chases
Fairyhouse Racecourse
1994 establishments in Ireland
Recurring sporting events established in 1994